Colly Township is a district in Bladen County, North Carolina, United States.

Colly Township was once home to the WECT tower, a guyed TV tower, which was one of the tallest constructions in the world. Erected in 1969, the tower was demolished in 2012.

References

Populated places in Bladen County, North Carolina